Lyricism is a quality that expresses deep feelings or emotions in an inspired work of art.

Often used to describe the capability of a Lyricist.

Description 
Lyricism is when art is expressed in a beautiful or imaginative way, or when it has an expressive quality. Although the term "lyricism" is often used in conjunction with art composed of sound alone, it can also apply to all forms of art, including paintings, performance, poetry, architecture, or film.

Uses of lyricism 

Although it is impossible to define beauty, emotion, or imagination in a definitive manner, it is possible to draw upon examples of works that may share those characteristics in both subtle and dramatic ways.  The following are some classic examples of lyricism:

Architecture: The Nasir ol-Molk Mosque may be seen as an example, as well as the Taj Mahal, or the Sistine Chapel. Modern examples would be some of the later works of Le Corbusier and Zaha Hadid.
Dance: Tchaikovsky's Swan Lake, or The Sleeping Beauty exhibit classic lyricism. 
Film: Lost, Lost, Lost (1976) has been described as an example of the mid-20th century lyricism movement in film, as well as The Art of Vision (1965) and Fireworks (1947).
Music: In Jazz, Charlie Parker is renowned for his lyricism. In Classical music, nearly all of Wolfgang Amadeus Mozart's work has been revered at one time or another for its lyricism. 
Painting: The Starry Night by Vincent van Gogh can be considered the sine qua non of lyricism in the world of art.
Poetry: Maya Angelou's poetry has intrinsic lyricism.

See also 
Art
Beauty
Emotion
Imagination
Lyric poetry
Western canon

References

Theories of aesthetics